The 2019 South Korean Figure Skating Championships were held from January 11–13, 2019 at the Mokdong Ice Rink in Seoul. It was organized by the Korean Skating Union. This was the 73rd edition of these championships held.

Skaters competed in the disciplines of men's singles and ladies' singles on the senior and junior levels and ice dancing on the junior level for the title of national champion of South Korea. The results of the national championships were used to choose the Korean teams to the 2019 World Junior Championships and 2019 World Championships.

Senior results
Cha Jun-hwan and You Young both won their third senior national titles.

Senior men

Senior ladies

International team selections

Four Continents Championships
The 2019 Four Continents Figure Skating Championships were held in Anaheim, California, United States from February 7–10, 2019.

World Junior Championships
The 2019 World Junior Figure Skating Championships were held in Zagreb, Croatia from March 4–10, 2019.

World Championships
The 2019 World Figure Skating Championships were held in Saitama, Japan, from March 18–24, 2019.

References

External links
 

South Korean Figure Skating Championships
South Korean Figure Skating Championships, 2019
Figure skating
January 2019 sports events in South Korea